ASA as an abbreviation or initialism may refer to:

Biology and medicine
 Accessible surface area of a biomolecule, accessible to a solvent
 Acetylsalicylic acid, aspirin
 Advanced surface ablation, refractive eye surgery
 Anterior spinal artery, the blood vessel which supplies the anterior portion of the spinal cord
 Antisperm antibodies, antibodies against sperm antigens
 Argininosuccinic aciduria, a disorder of the urea cycle
 ASA physical status classification system, rating of patients undergoing anesthesia

Education and research
 African Studies Association of the United Kingdom
 African Studies Association
Alandica Shipping Academy, Åland Islands, Finland
 Albany Students' Association, at Massey University, Auckland, New Zealand
 Alexander-Smith Academy, in Houston, Texas
 Alpha Sigma Alpha, U.S. national sorority
 American Society for Aesthetics, philosophical organization
 American Student Assistance, national non-profit organization
 American Studies Association
 Arizona School for the Arts
 Armenian Sisters Academy
 Association of Social Anthropologists
 Astronomical Society of Australia
 Austrian Studies Association

Organizations 
 Acoustical Society of America, international scientific society
 Advertising Standards Authority (disambiguation), advertising regulators in several countries
 Aid to Southeast Asia, a non-governmental organization
 American Scientific Affiliation, an organization of Christians in science
 American Society of Agronomy
 American Society of Anesthesiologists
 American Society of Appraisers
American Sociological Association
 American Staffing Association
 American Standards Association, a former name of the American National Standards Institute
 American Statistical Association
 American Synesthesia Association
 Americans for Safe Access, marijuana law reform group
 Association for Social Advancement, microfinance institution, Bangladesh
 Association for the Study of Abortion
 Association of Scouts of Azerbaijan
 Association of Southeast Asia
 Australian Society of Authors
 Australian Space Agency
 Austrian Service Abroad
 Autism Society of America
 United States Army Security Agency

Sports
 Agremiação Sportiva Arapiraquense, Brazilian soccer club
 Alliance Sport Alsace, French basketball club
 Amateur Softball Association, former name of the governing body now known as USA Softball
 Amateur Swimming Association, former name of Swim England
 American Sailing Association
 American Samoa, IOC country code
 American Speed Association, motorsports sanctioning body
 American Sportscasters Association
 Arizona Soccer Association
 Athletics South Africa, the national governing body for the sport of athletics in South Africa
 Atlético Sport Aviação, Angolan multisports club
 United States Adult Soccer Association

Transportation
 ASA (automobile), Italian marque of automobiles (Autocostruzioni Società per Azioni)
 ASA Aluminium Body, Argentinian manufacturer of replicas of sports cars
 Aeropuertos y Servicios Auxiliares, Mexican airport operator
 African Safari Airways, airline company based in East Africa
 Air services agreement, bilateral agreement to allow international commercial air transport services between signatories
 Atlantic Southeast Airlines, in Atlanta area, Georgia
 Airline Superintendents Association, of Trinidad & Tobago
 Airservices Australia, air traffic management and related services provider for Australia
 The International Civil Aviation Organization's code for Alaska Airlines

Other
 ASA, a measure of film speed in photography, later replaced by the ISO standard
 Acrylonitrile styrene acrylate, a plastic polymer
 Adaptive simulated annealing, optimization algorithm
 Cisco ASA (Adaptive Security Appliances)
 Allied States of America, a fictional American nation in the television show Jericho
 Allmennaksjeselskap, the designation for a Norwegian public limited company
 Anti-Soviet agitation, a criminal offense in the Soviet Union
 ASA carriage control characters, a system used for controlling mainframe line printers
 Assistant state's attorney, a title for attorneys working in the state's attorney's office in the United States
 As-salamu alaykum, a greeting in Arabic that means "peace be upon you"
 Auditory scene analysis, a proposed model for the basis of auditory perception

See also

 Åsa (disambiguation)